Alembic is an interchangeable computer graphics file format developed by Sony Pictures Imageworks and Industrial Light & Magic. It was announced at SIGGRAPH 2011, and has been widely adopted across the industry by visual effects and animation professionals.

Its primary focus is the efficient interchange of animated geometry (models) between different groups working on the same shots or same assets, possibly using different applications. Often different departments in the same company or different studios are working on the same projects. Alembic supports the common geometric representations used in the industry, including polygon meshes, subdivision surface, parametric curves, NURBS patches and particles. Alembic also has support for transform hierarchies and cameras. With the latest version comes initial support for materials and lights as well. Alembic specifically is not focused on storing the complex dependency graphs of procedural tools but instead stores the "baked" results by sampling the model data at different points along an animated scene's timeline.

Tools which support Alembic

Tools with native support

Plugins

References

External links
 
 

3D graphics file formats
Lucasfilm